O RLY? is an Internet phenomenon, typically presented as an image macro featuring a snowy owl. The phrase "O RLY?", an abbreviated form of "Oh, really?", is popularly used in Internet forums in a sarcastic manner, often in response to an obvious, predictable, or blatantly false statement. Similar owl image macros followed the original to present different views, including images with the phrases "YA RLY" (Yeah, really.), "NO WAI!!" (No way!), and NO RLY. (Not really.)

History 

Outside of Internet forums, O RLY? has been referenced in various video games, including World of Warcraft in which the auctioneer characters O’Reely and Yarly are a reference to "O RLY?" and "YA RLY!", respectively.

Hoots computer worm 
In 2006, anti-virus company Sophos discovered a computer worm known as "W32/Hoots-A", which sends a graphical image of a snowy owl with the letters "O RLY?" to a print queue when it infects a Windows-based computer. A Sophos spokesman said that it appeared that the virus, written in Visual Basic, was not written by a professional, but that: "it appears this malware was written for a specific organization, by someone who had inside knowledge of their IT infrastructure."

Parodies 
O’Reilly Media's book covers on programming and technology have been parodied online using the term O RLY?, first popularised by a meme generator by Ben Halpern.

See also 
 Lolcat

References

External links 

 O RLY? Gallery including original concept

Fictional owls
Internet slang
Animals on the Internet
Internet memes introduced in 2003
2003 neologisms

de:Liste von Abkürzungen (Netzjargon)#O
fr:Liste de termes d'argot Internet#mno